Kill for Pleasure is the debut album by Blood Feast. It was released on February 13, 1987, by New Renaissance Records.

Track listing
 "Menacing Thunder" – 4:31
 "Kill for Pleasure" – 3:13 
 "Cannibal" – 4:55 
 "Vampire" – 5:14   
 "Suicidal Mission " – 5:04 
 "Venomous Death" – 3:59  
 "The Evil" – 3:30  
 "Darkside" – 3:55
 "R.I.P" - 3:06

Credits
 Gary Markovitch – vocals 
 Mike Basden – guitar 
 Kevin Kuzma – drums
 Adam Tranquilli – guitar
 Lou Starita – bass

References

1987 debut albums
Blood Feast (band) albums